Henning Scherf (born 31 October 1938 in Bremen) is a German lawyer and politician of the SPD party who served as President of the Senate and Mayor of Bremen from 4 July 1995 to 8 November 2005.

Education
After studying law and social sciences from 1958 until 1962 in Berlin, Hamburg and Freiburg Scherf worked for a Protestant students association (Evangelisches Studentenwerk) until 1964. In 1968 he received his law doctorate from University of Hamburg.

Political career
Scherf has been a member of the Social Democratic Party of Germany since 1963.

Scherf went into politics after practicing as a lawyer in Bremen, and was elected to the Bremer Bürgerschaft (parliament) in 1971. From 1978 until 2005 he was a member of Bremen Senate (government) in various functions, including Senator for Finances, Senator for Youth and Social Issues, Senator for Health and Sport, Mayor, Senator for Education and Sciences and Senator of Law and Constitution. In 1995 Scherf was elected President of the Senate and Mayor of Bremen.

He was also the head of the "Vermittlungsausschuss" (negotiations-committee) which resolves conflicts concerning legislation between "Bundesrat" and "Bundestag", the two houses of the German parliament at the federal level.

Scherf has been re-elected twice due to his popularity in Bremen. He is well known for his warm and friendly character despite his looks (he is 2 m tall). His diplomatic skills, especially in forging compromises and running negotiations, are considered legendary, not only by members of his own party.

For some time Scherf was urged by the people to run for the German Presidency (Bundespräsident) which he declined because of family reasons.

Other activities
 Max Planck Institute for Demographic Research, Member of the Board of Trustees
 Gustav Heinemann Civic Award of the SPD, Chairman of the Board of Trustees

Personal life
Henning Scherf married his wife Luise in 1960. The couple has three children and nine grandchildren.

He is well known for going to work by bicycle and refusing to accept a car and a driver provided by the city. He also has the habit of only drinking warm water with his meals.

References

1938 births
Living people
Social Democratic Party of Germany politicians
Mayors of Bremen
Members of the Bürgerschaft of Bremen
Jurists from Bremen (state)
Christian Peace Conference members
University of Hamburg alumni